Punjab United F.C. is a football club based in Gravesend, Kent, England.

History
The club was founded in 2003. The club joined the Kent County League Premier Division in 2016, and in their inaugural season won the Kent Intermediate Challenge Cup, were finalists in the Kent County League Cup, and were crowned the 2016–17 League champions. The club were the first Asian team to win the league and did so with the highest league points total in the history of the league. The club was promoted to Step 6 of the National League System for the first time, being allocated to the Southern Counties East League.

In August 2019, they competed in the FA Cup Qualifying for the first time.

In popular culture
Punjab United's 2018–19 season was the subject of an episode of the BBC documentary series Our Lives. In October 2022, an advertisement for Punjab United featuring Soccer Saturday presenter Jeff Stelling went viral on social media.

Honours
Kent County League Premier Division and Kent Intermediate Challenge Shield Champions 2016–17.

References

External links
 Punjab United FC (@PUFC_Gravesend) | Twitter

Football clubs in England
Football clubs in Kent
Association football clubs established in 2003
2003 establishments in England
Kent County League
Southern Counties East Football League
Diaspora sports clubs in the United Kingdom
Diaspora association football clubs in England